The Confederation of Women Entrepreneurs (COWE) is a NGO/social organization engaged in the social and economic "upliftment of women through entrepreneurship". The slogan "Gearing women power" stands for the democratic structure of COWE and stands for "Of the women, for the women and by the women".

It was inaugurated on 22 December 2004 by Honourable Chief Minister of Andhra Pradesh, Shri Y.S.Rajasekhara Reddy at Jubilee Hall, Hyderabad, India. It has over four hundred and fifty entrepreneur members in the fields of food processing, information technology, pharmaceuticals, printing, packaging, manufacturing, retailing, industries, textiles and the like.

COWE's vision is to build a group of women who are economically empowered, valued citizens of the nation by combining the dormant talent, skills, practical knowledge and resources of women with dedication and commitment.

COWE's mission is to enhance women's opportunities by creating a resource base of technical know-how, management, marketing skills, finance, infrastructure and equipment to promote entrepreneurship.

COWE partners with ZDH-SEQUA.

Study tours by delegates of COWE have been undertaken to Australia, Sri Lanka, Germany and Egypt with the support of the ZDH-SEQUA Partnership Programme.

To enable women entrepreneurs to showcase their products and to network with member organisations in India and abroad, COWE organised its first trade fair, COWE Trade Carnival, on 26–28 October 2007, at the Necklace Road in Hyderabad. A sequel to it was organised in 2008.

An automotive park with 25 women entrepreneurs is being developed in the  allotted to COWE by Government of Andhra Pradesh.

The Andhra Pradesh government allocated  of land in three different areas in Medak district for COWE to set up exclusive industrial estates for women.

Founder Members
Ms Shylaja Reddy
Ms Sumankumar
Ms. UmaGurkha
Ms. Soudhamini
Ms. Sandhya Reddy
Ms. Girija Reddy

Managing Committee members (2016-2017)

Ms Geeta Goti, President
Ms R.RamaDevi, Vice President
Ms Vandana Maheswary, National Secretary
Ms Aluri Lalitha, Secretary
Ms Neeraja Reddy, Jt. Secretary
Ms Jyostna Cheruvu, Treasurer
Ms P.Girija, Past President

News on COWE

COWE set up a Business Innovation Centre which is a business-to-business portal aiming to create a networking circle among women entrepreneurs across the globe. The BIC was set up by COWE in collaboration with the University of East London (UEL).
COWE set up a food park which was supposedly posed to attract more than INR 200 crores of investment as well as participation from more than a hundred companies.

References

External links

Entrepreneurship organizations
Women's occupational organizations
Organizations established in 2004
Organisations based in Hyderabad, India
Women's organisations based in India
2004 establishments in Andhra Pradesh
Indian women company founders